The Brothers Karamazov is a 1958 American period drama film directed by Richard Brooks from a screenplay co-written with Julius and Philip Epstein, based on Fyodor Dostoevsky's eponymous 1880 novel. It stars Yul Brynner, Maria Schell, Claire Bloom, Lee J. Cobb, Albert Salmi, Richard Basehart, and William Shatner in his film debut.

The film was released by Metro-Goldwyn-Mayer on February 20, 1958. It received mixed-to-positive reviews from critics, though the performances were widely praised. It was nominated for the Palme d'Or at the Cannes Film Festival, and Lee J. Cobb received an Oscar nomination performance as Fyodor Karamazov. The National Board of Review ranked The Brothers Karamazov as one of its Top 10 Films of 1958.

Plot

The story follows Fyodor, the patriarch of the Karamazov family, and his sons. When he tries to decide on an heir, the tensions among the brothers run high, leading to infighting and murder.

Cast

Production
Marilyn Monroe was rumored to be in negotiations to play the role of Grushenka, but several conflicting accounts arose around the time the film entered production. An MGM executive said she'd turned down the role in part because she was expecting a baby, but Monroe's agent denied this and claimed that the studio had never even made her an offer. Richard Brooks said that Monroe would have made a "fine" Grushenka, but claimed that negotiations fell through "because of her contractual demands and personal troubles." Carroll Baker was the next choice for the role, but Warner Bros. put her on suspension and would not loan her out after she refused to play Diana Barrymore in Too Much, Too Soon. Maria Schell stepped in instead, making her American film debut. It was also the film debut for William Shatner, Albert Salmi and Simon Oakland.

The film was shot from June to August 1957 on location in London and Paris.

Release 

The film had its premiere at Radio City Music Hall in New York on February 20, 1958. It opened at the Pantages Theatre in Los Angeles on February 26 and a day later at 3 theaters in Florida before expanding to 20 US cities in March.

Reception
In its opening week at Radio City Music Hall it grossed $157,000. In its third week of release, the film reached number one at the US box office. According to MGM records, the film made $2,390,000 in the U.S. and Canada and $3,050,000 in other markets, resulting in a profit of $441,000.

Critical response 
Contemporary reviews were mixed to positive. 

Bosley Crowther of The New York Times wrote "Except for a halfway happy ending that blunts the drama's irony, [Brooks] has done a good job of compressing the substance of the book...But most of all, Mr. Brooks and Mr. Berman have put upon the screen a large splash of vigorous drama and passion involving interesting, robust characters." Variety declared "Sumptuous and sensitive MGM production by Pandro S. Berman doesn't sacrifice art to entertainment nor lose entertainment in a false conception of what constitutes art. 'The Brothers Karamazov' should be one of the year's commercial successes." Harrison's Reports wrote: "Excellent is the word for this absorbing and vigorous screen version of Fyodor Dostoyevsky's epic novel...The acting is superb, with brilliant performances turned in by Lee J. Cobb, as the lecherous and crafty father, and by Yul Brynner, as his fiery, quick-tempered eldest son."  For the Los Angeles Times, Philip K. Scheuer called Brynner's performance "impressive" and wrote that Lee J. Cobb as Fyodor "succeeds in striking a recognizable and responsive chord with an audience," but found that Maria Schell's Grushenka was played "with a persisting Mona Lisa smile that I felt was not only foreign to the role of the materialistic, venal harlot but was also incomprehensibly at variance with her changing moods." 

In more critical reviews, John McCarten of The New Yorker declared that the film "goes on for about two and a half hours, most of which you'd be better off spending at some more rewarding pursuit...I think that Mr. Brooks, in addition to being saddled with actors who just can't stand up to the obligations they've assumed, never quite grapples with the ideas that Dostoevski was trying to propound." The Monthly Film Bulletin wrote "There is none of Dostoievsky's profundity or exciting exploration of motive. All the brothers emerge as quite inexplicable people. It is hard to be sympathetic to Dmitri, and not to be embarrassed by Alyosha or scornful of Ivan. The performances throughout suggest that the cast never really knew what it was all about."

Awards and nominations

See also
 List of American films of 1958

References

External links

 
 
 
 
 

1958 films
1958 drama films
American drama films
1950s English-language films
Films based on The Brothers Karamazov
Films about gambling
Films set in Russia
Films set in the 19th century
Metro-Goldwyn-Mayer films
Films directed by Richard Brooks
Films produced by Pandro S. Berman
Films scored by Bronisław Kaper
1950s American films